The article currently lists the first appearances of the 55 national teams that have made at least one appearance in the FIBA Women's Basketball World Cup, formerly known as the FIBA World Championship for Women, through the 2018 edition.

Debut of national teams

Comprehensive team results
{| class="wikitable"  style="text-align:center;"
|- style="background:#cccccc;"
!Team
!1953
!1957
!1959
!1964
!1967
!1971
!1975
!1979
!1983
!1986
!1990
!1994
!1998
!2002
!2006
!2010
!2014
!2018
!2022
! Total
|-
|align=left| || – || – || – || – || – || – || – || – || – || – || – || – || – || – || – || – || 16th || – || – || 1
|-
|align=left| || 6th || 9th || – || 13th || – || 11th || – || – || – || – || – || – || 15th || 10th || 9th || 14th || – || 15th || – || 9
|-
|align=left| || – || 10th || – || – || 10th || 9th || 10th || style="background-color:#9acdff |4th || 11th || 9th || 6th || style="background-color:#9acdff; border: 3px solid red" |4th || bgcolor=cc9966| 3rd || bgcolor=cc9966| 3rd || bgcolor=gold| 1st || 5th || bgcolor=cc9966| 3rd || bgcolor=silver| 2nd || style="border: 3px solid red" bgcolor=cc9966| 3rd || 16
|-
|align=left| || – || – || – || – || – || – || – || – || – || – || – || – || – || – || – || style="background-color:#9acdff |4th || 10th || – || – || 2
|-
|align=left| || – || – || – || – || – || – || – || – || – || – || – || – || – || – || – || – || – || style="background-color:#9acdff |4th || 5th || 2
|-
|align=left| || – || – || – || – || – || – || – || 10th || – || – || – || – || – || – || – || – || – || – || – || 1
|-
|align=left| || – || – || – || – || – || – || – || – || – || – || – || – || – || – || – || – || – || – || 12th || 1
|-
|align=left| || style="background-color:#9acdff |4th || style="background-color:#9acdff; border: 3px solid red"|4th || – || 5th || 8th ||style="border: 3px solid red" bgcolor=cc9966| 3rd || 12th || 9th ||style="border: 3px solid red"|5th || 11th || 10th || bgcolor=gold| 1st || style="background-color:#9acdff |4th || 7th || style="background-color:#9acdff; border: 3px solid red" |4th || 9th || 11th || – || – || 16
|-
|align=left| || – || – || bgcolor=silver| 2nd || bgcolor=cc9966| 3rd || 7th || – || – || WD || 6th || 7th || 8th || – || – || – || – || – || – || – || – || 6
|-
|align=left| || – || – || – || – || – || 10th || 11th || bgcolor=cc9966| 3rd || 9th || bgcolor="cc9966" | 3rd || 7th || 7th || – || – || 10th || 12th || 5th || 7th || style="background-color:#9acdff |4th || 12
|-
|align=left| || style="border: 3px solid red" bgcolor=silver |2nd || 7th || – || 11th || – || – || – || – || – || – || – || – || – || – || – || – || – || – || – || 3
|-
|align=left| || – || – || – || – || – || – || – || WD || bgcolor=cc9966| 3rd || 5th || 9th || bgcolor=silver| 2nd || 12th || style="border: 3px solid red"|6th || 12th || 13th || 6th || 6th || bgcolor=silver| 2nd || 11
|-
|align=left| || – || – || – || – || – || – || – || – || – || 12th || – || 14th || – || 14th || 14th || – || – || – || – || 4
|-
|align=left| || – || – || – || – || – || – || style="border: 3px solid red"|7th || – || – || – || – || – || – || – || – || – || – || – || – || 1
|-
|align=left| || – || – || – || – || – || – || – || – || 14th || – || 15th || – || 16th || – || – || – || – || – || – || 3
|-
|align=left| || 10th || 12th || – || – || – || 7th || – || – || 10th || 6th || bgcolor=cc9966| 3rd || 6th || 7th || 9th || 11th || – || 12th || – || – || 11
|-
|align=left| || – || – || – || – || – || – || – || – || – || – || – || – || – || – || 7th || style="border: 3px solid red" bgcolor=silver|2nd || 9th || – || – || 3
|-
|align=left| †  || – || bgcolor=cc9966| 3rd || bgcolor=cc9966| 3rd || bgcolor=silver| 2nd || style="border: 3px solid red" bgcolor=cc9966| 3rd || bgcolor=silver| 2nd || bgcolor=cc9966| 3rd || WD || – || style="background-color:#9acdff |4th || style="background-color:#9acdff |4th || – || – || – || – || – || – || – || – || 8
|-
|align=left| † || – || – || – || – || style="background-color:#9acdff |4th || – || – || – || – || – || – || – || – || – || – || – || – || – || – || 1
|-
|align=left| || – || – || – || – || – || 12th || – || – || – || – || – || – || – || – || – || – || – || – || – || 1
|-
|align=left| || bgcolor=cc9966| 3rd || – || – || 10th || – || 6th || – || 7th || – || – || – || 9th || – || 8th || 5th || 6th || 7th || 5th || 7th || 11
|-
|align=left| || – || – || – || – || – || – || – || – || – || – || – || – || style="border: 3px solid red"|11th || – || – || – || – || – || – || 1
|-
|align=left|  || – || – || – || – || – || – || – || – || – || – || – || – || – || – || – || 11th || – || 11th || – || 2
|-
|align=left| || – || 5th || 7th || – || – || – || 9th || – || – || 8th || – || – || 10th || – || – || – || – || – || – || 5
|-
|align=left| || – || – || – || – || 9th || – || style="background-color:#9acdff |4th || 5th || – || – || 13th || 11th || – || – || – || – || – || – || – || 5
|-
|align=left| || – || – || – || 9th || 5th || 5th || bgcolor=silver| 2nd || 6th || 12th || – || 12th || 12th || 9th || 13th || – || 10th || 14th || 9th || 9th || 14
|-
|align=left| || – || – || – || – || – || – || – || – || – || – || – || 16th || – || – || – || – || – || – || – || 1
|-
|align=left| || – || – || – || – || – || – || – || – || – || – || – || – || – || – || – || – || – || 13th || – || 1
|-
|align=left| || – || – || – || – || – || – || – || – || – || – || – || – || 6th || 11th || 6th || – || – || – || – || 3
|-
|align=left| || – || – || – || – || – || 13th || – || – || – || – || – || – || – || – || – || – || – || – || – || 1
|-
|align=left| || – || – || – || – || – || – || – || 11th || – || – || style="border: 3px solid red"|16th || – || – || – || – || – || – || – || – || 2
|-
|align=left|  || – || – || – || – || – || – || – || – || – || – || – || – || – || – || – || 15th || – || – || 11th || 2
|-
|align=left| || 8th || 8th || – || – || – || – || 6th || WD || – || – || – || – || – || – || – || – || – || – || – || 3
|-
|align=left| || – || – || – || – || – || – || – || – || – || – || – || – || – || – || – || – || 15th || – || – || 1
|-
|align=left| || – || – || – || – || – || – || – || 8th || – || – || – || – || – || – || – || – || – || – || – || 1
|-
|align=left| || – || – || – || – || – || – || – || – || – || – || – || 15th || – || – || – || – || – || – || – || 1
|-
|align=left| || – || – || – || – || – || – || – || – || – || – || – || – || – || – || 16th || – || – || 8th || WD || 2
|-
|align=left| || – || – || 8th || – || – || – || – || – || – || – || – || – || – || – || – || – || – || – || – || 1
|-F
|align=left| || 5th || 6th || – || 12th || – || – || – || – || – || – || – || – || – || – || – || – || – || – || – || 3
|-
|align=left| || 7th || 11th || – || style="border: 3px solid red"| 7th || – || – || – || – || 13th || – || – || – || – || – || – || – || – || – || – || 4
|-
|align=left| || – || – || 5th || – || – || – || – || – || 7th || – || – || 13th || – || – || – || – || – || – || – || 3
|-
|align=left| || – || – || – || – || – || – || – || – || – || – || – || – || – || – || – || – || – || 16th || 8th || 2
|-
|align=left| || – || – || 6th || – || – || – || – || – || – || – || – || – || – || – || – || – || – || – || – || 1
|-
|align=left| || – || – || – || – || – || – || – || – || – || – || – || – || bgcolor=silver| 2nd || bgcolor=silver| 2nd || bgcolor=silver| 2nd || 7th || – || – || DQ || 4
|-
|align=left| || – || – || – || – || – || – || 13th || 12th || WD || – || 14th || WD || 14th || 15th || 15th || 16th || – || 12th || – || 8
|-
|align=left| || – || – || – || – || – || – || – || – || – || – || – || – || – || – || – || – || 8th || – || 6th || 2
|-
|align=left| || – || – || – || – || – || – || – || – || – || – || – || 5th || 8th || – || – || – || – || – || – || 2
|-
|align=left| || – || – || – || 8th || bgcolor=silver| 2nd || style="background-color:#9acdff |4th || 5th || style="border: 3px solid red" bgcolor=silver| 2nd || style="background-color:#9acdff |4th || 10th || 11th || 10th || 13th || style="background-color:#9acdff |4th || 13th || 8th || 13th || 14th || 10th || 16
|-
|align=left| † || – || bgcolor=silver| 2nd || style="border: 3px solid red" bgcolor=gold|  1st || bgcolor=gold| 1st || bgcolor=gold| 1st || bgcolor=gold| 1st || bgcolor=gold| 1st || WD || bgcolor=gold| 1st || style="border: 3px solid red" bgcolor=silver| 2nd || 5th || – || – || – || – || – || – || – || – || 9
|-
|align=left| || – || – || – || – || – || – || – || – || – || – || – || 8th || 5th || 5th || 8th || bgcolor=cc9966| 3rd || bgcolor=silver| 2nd || style="border: 3px solid red" bgcolor=cc9966| 3rd || – || 7
|-
|align=left| || 9th || – || – || – || – || – || – || – || – || – || – || – || – || – || – || – || – || – || – || 1
|-
|align=left| || – || – || – || – || – || – || – || – || – || – || – || – || – || 16th || – || – || – || – || – || 1
|-
|align=left| || – || – || – || – || – || – || – || – || – || – || – || – || – || – || – || – || style="background-color:#9acdff; border: 3px solid red" |4th || 10th || – || 2
|-
|align=left| || bgcolor=gold| 1st || bgcolor=gold| 1st || – || style="background-color:#9acdff |4th || 11th || 8th || 8th || bgcolor=gold| 1st || bgcolor=silver| 2nd || bgcolor=gold| 1st || bgcolor=gold| 1st || bgcolor=cc9966| 3rd || bgcolor=gold| 1st || bgcolor=gold| 1st || bgcolor=cc9966| 3rd || bgcolor=gold| 1st || bgcolor=gold| 1st || bgcolor=gold| 1st || bgcolor=gold| 1st || 18
|-
|align=left| †  || – || – || style="background-color:#9acdff |4th || 6th || 6th || – || – || WD || 8th || – || bgcolor=silver| 2nd || – || – || 12th || – || – || – || – || – || 6
|-
!Total || 10 || 12 || 8 || 13 || 11 || 13 || 13 || 12 || 14 || 12 || 16 || 16 || 16 || 16 || 16 || 16 || 16 || 16 || 12 || 
|}

Ranking of teams by number of appearances

Overall won/lost records from 1953 to 2022

References

FIBA Women's Basketball World Cup
Basketball statistics